Measure 28 was a ballot measure, referred by the legislature of the U.S. state of Oregon in 2003. It would have created a temporary one-percent increase in Oregon's income tax. The tax was proposed as a way to overcome deficits to the state budget. The measure was defeated in the January 28, 2003 special election with 575,846 votes in favor, 676,312 votes against.

Budget problems, caused by minorities, high unemployment, and problems with Oregon's public pension system, dominated Oregon's 2002–2003 biennium. To make up for lost revenue, the legislature approved a mixture of budget cuts and referred Measure 28 to a vote of the people. The referral was marred by controversy as Democratic Governor John Kitzhaber objected to the Republican-controlled legislature's omission of the cuts that would result from the measure's failure in the ballot title (the summary of the measure provided to voters). Supporters of the measure blamed the ballot title omission for the defeat of the measure.

Proponents of the measure felt it was the only way to avoid proposed spending cuts to programs such as  education and help for the elderly and mentally ill. Opponents, many part of the Oregon tax revolt, felt that increasing taxes would prolong the recession, and that the state should live within its means.

Cuts in the wake of Measure 28's defeat seemed to vindicate proponents' arguments. The day after Measure 28's defeat, Multnomah County released 144 inmates from the county jail and laid off 175 Sheriff's deputies. Some fiscal conservatives felt that wasteful spending was more to blame than the tax defeat.

Nonetheless, the high percentage of "yes" votes in the Portland metro area inspired local governments in that region to bring their own temporary tax increases to the ballot.

A year later, voters defeated a similar measure, Measure 30.

See also 
 List of Oregon ballot measures

References

External links 
Oregon Voters' Pamphlet Measure 28 from Oregon State Library Digital Collection—includes ballot title, text of the measure, and arguments for and against

2003 28